Broward County Public Schools is a public school district serving Broward County, Florida, is the sixth largest public school system in the nation. During the 2016–2017 school year, Broward County Public Schools served 271,517 students enrolled in 327 schools and education centers district wide. The district is headquartered in downtown Fort Lauderdale. It is the sole school district in the county.

History

William J. Leary served as superintendent until 1988; the school board did not want him to serve out the remainder of his term, so it paid him $113,516 in severance. In 1994 Frank Petruzielo became the superintendent.

School Board
The current Superintendent of schools is Dr. Vickie Cartwright. The members of the school board, which oversee the district, are as follows:
District 1 – Daniel Foganholi 
District 2 – Torey Alston
District 3 – Sarah Leonardi
District 4 – Lori Alhadeff (Vice Chair)
District 5 – Dr. Jeff Holness
District 6 – Brenda Fam
District 7 – Nora Rupert
District 8 (At Large) – Dr. Allen Zeman
District 9 (At Large) – Debra Hixon (Chair)

Superintendent of Schools
William Leary (1984-1988)
Sam Morgan (1988-1994)
Frank Petruzielo (1994-1999)
Frank Till (1999-2006)
James Notter (2006-2011)
Robert Runcie (2011-2021)
Vickie Cartwright (2021-2023)
Earlean C. Smiley (2023-present)

Controversies

Handling of Stoneman Douglas High School Shooting
On February 14, 2018, a former student opened fire at a Broward school, Marjory Stoneman Douglas High School in Parkland, Florida, murdering 17 people and injuring 17 others.

Superintendent Robert Runcie and the School Board faced criticism for their handling of policies and the lack of guidance assisted to the shooter. In April 2018, student Kenneth Preston revealed an investigation into an $800 million bond for safety and building projects that the school board had not carried out efficiently. Runcie and the Board faced particular criticism, including from some parents of students at Stoneman Douglas High School, for the creation of an alternative discipline program for students accused of nonviolent misdemeanors called "Promise", which the Parkland shooter had been referred to. 

In the lead up to the 2018 gubernatorial election, Republican candidate Ron DeSantis vowed to remove Runcie from his office, although he conceded that only the school board could do so. On February 13, 2019, now Florida Governor DeSantis announced that he had petitioned a statewide grand jury investigation.

In May 2021, after the grand jury indicted him for perjury during their investigation, Runcie announced his intention to step down. Supporters of Runcie accused the grand jury investigation that led to his indictment of being politically motivated.

School closures and mask mandates during the COVID-19 pandemic
Amidst the COVID-19 pandemic, the school district switched almost entirely to online classes in March 2020 and gradually returned to in-person instruction starting in the fall of 2020. The exact timing of school re-openings led to tension between the school board and the state government. Throughout the 2020-2021 school year, the district required all students and staff to wear face masks as a preventative measure. In the fall of 2021, growing public opposition to mask mandates led Governor Ron DeSantis to prohibit local school districts from requiring masks.  The school board chose to defy the state government and continue requiring masks, along with several other school districts in the state. In response the Florida Board of Education voted to prevent the district from doing so and could replace elected board members. DeSantis withheld funding from school districts that required masks. The federal government stepped in to replace the money with federal funds, but after the state blocked that funding as well, the US Department of Education warned the state that it may have violated federal law.

List of schools
During the 2016–2017 academic school year, the District served 271,205 students. The district covers a total of 286 institutions: 138 elementary schools, 43 middle schools, 33 high schools, 16 adult/vocational schools, 16 centers, and 56 charter schools.

6-12 secondary schools
 Dillard High School 6-12 (1907)
 Lauderhill 6-12 STEM-MED
 Millennium 6-12 Collegiate Academy

High schools

 Atlantic Technical College and Technical High School (1973)
 Blanche Ely High School (1951)
 Boyd H. Anderson High School (1971)
 Broward Virtual Education High (2001)
 Charles W. Flanagan High School (1996)
 Coconut Creek High School (1970)
 Cooper City High School (1971)
 College Academy @ BCC (2001)
 Coral Glades High School (2004)
 Coral Springs High School (1975)
 Cypress Bay High School (2002)
 Dave Thomas Educational Center - formerly North County Educational Ctr. (1986)
 Dillard High School (1907)
 Deerfield Beach High School (1970)
 Everglades High School (2003)
 Fort Lauderdale High School (1899)
 Hallandale High School (1973)
 Hollywood Hills High School (1967)

 J. P. Taravella High School (1980)
 McArthur High School (1961)
 McFatter Technical College and Technical High School (1985)
 Miramar High School (1970)
 Monarch High School (2003)
 Northeast High School (1962)
 Nova High School (1960)
 Piper High School (1971)
 Plantation High School (1963)
 Pompano Beach High School (1928)
 Sheridan Technical College and High School (1967)
 South Broward High School (1952)
 South Plantation High School (1971)
 Marjory Stoneman Douglas High School (1990)
 Stranahan High School (1953)
 West Broward High School (2008)
 Western High School (1981)

Middle schools

Apollo Middle School 
Arthur Ashe Middle School (closed, nowa campus of Atlantic Technical College)
Attucks Middle School
Bair Middle School
Broward Virtual Middle
Coral Springs Middle School
Crystal Lake Middle School
Deerfield Beach Middle School
Driftwood Middle School
Falcon Cove Middle School
Forest Glen Middle School 
Glades Middle School
Gulfstream Middle School
Indian Ridge Middle School
Lauderdale Lakes Middle School
Lyons Creek Middle School
Margate Middle School
McNicol Middle School
New Renaissance Middle School

New River Middle School
Nova Middle School
Olsen Middle School
Parkway Middle School of the Arts
Pines Middle School
Pioneer Middle School
Plantation Middle School
Pompano Beach Middle School
Ramblewood Middle School
James S. Richtards Middle School
Sawgrass Springs Middle School
Seminole Middle School
Silver Lakes Middle School
Silver Trail Middle School
Sunrise Middle School
Tequesta Trace Middle School
Walter C. Young Middle School
Westglades Middle School
Westpine Middle School
William Dandy Middle School

Elementary schools

Annabel C. Perry Elementary School
Atlantic West Elementary School 
Banyan Elementary School
Bayview Elementary School
Beachside Montessori Village (K–8)
Bennett Elementary School
Mary M. Bethune Elementary School
Boulevard Heights Elementary School
Broadview Elementary School
Broward Estates Elementary School
Castle Hill Elementary School
Central Park Elementary School
Challenger Elementary School
Chapel Trail Elementary School
Coconut Creek Elementary School
Coconut Palm Elementary School
Colbert Elementary School
Collins Elementary School
Cooper City Elementary School
Coral Cove Elementary School
Coral Park Elementary School
Coral Springs Elementary School
Country Hills Elementary School
Country Isles Elementary School
Cresthaven Elementary School
Croissant Park Elementary School
Cypress Elementary School
Dania Elementary School
Davie Elementary School
Deerfield Beach Elementary School
Deerfield Park Elementary School
Dillard Elementary School
Discovery Elementary School
Dolphin Bay Elementary School
Charles Drew Elementary School
Driftwood Elementary School
Eagle Point Elementary School
Eagle Ridge Elementary School
Embassy Creek Elementary School (1992)
Endeavour Primary Learning Center
Everglades Elementary School
Fairway Elementary School
Flamingo Elementary School
Floranada Elementary School
Forest Hills Elementary School
Stephen Foster Elementary School
Fox Trail Elementary School
Gator Run Elementary School
Griffin Elementary School
Hallandale Elementary School
Harbordale Elementary School
Hawkes Bluff Elementary School
Heron Heights Elementary School
Hollywood Central Elementary School
Hollywood Hills Elementary School
Hollywood Park Elementary School
Horizon Elementary School
James S. Hunt Elementary School
Indian Trace Elementary School
Martin Luther King Elementary School
Lake Forest Elementary School
Lakeside Elementary School
Larkdale Elementary School
Lauderdale Manors Elementary School
Lauderhill Paul Turner Elementary School
Liberty Elementary School
Lloyd Estates Elementary School
Manatee Bay Elementary School
Maplewood Elementary School
Margate Elementary School
McNab Elementary School
Meadowbrook Elementary School
Miramar Elementary School
Mirror Lake Elementary School
Morrow Elementary School
Nob Hill Elementary School
Norcrest Elementary School
North Andrews Gardens Elementary School
North Fork Elementary School
North Lauderdale Elementary School
North Side Elementary School
Nova Blanche Forman Elementary School
Nova Dwight D. Eisenhower Elementary School
Oakland Park Elementary School
Oakridge Elementary School
Orange Brook Elementary School
Oriole Elementary School
Palm Cove Elementary School
Palmview Elementary School
Panther Run Elementary School (1998)
Park Lakes Elementary School
Park Ridge Elementary School
Park Springs Elementary School
Park Trails Elementary School
Parkside Elementary School
Pasadena Lakes Elementary School
Pembroke Lakes Elementary School
Pembroke Pines Elementary School
Perry, Annabel C. Elementary School
Peters Elementary School
Pines Lakes Elementary School
Pinewood Elementary School
Plantation Elementary School
Plantation Park Elementary School
Pompano Beach Elementary School
Quiet Waters Elementary School
Ramblewood Elementary School
Riverglades Elementary School
Riverland Elementary School
Riverside Elementary School
Robert C. Markham Elementary School
Rock Island Elementary School
Royal Palm Elementary School
Sanders Park Elementary School
Sandpiper Elementary School
Sawgrass Elementary School
Sea Castle Elementary School
Sheridan Hills Elementary School
Sheridan Park Elementary School
Silver Lakes Elementary School
Silver Palms Elementary School
Silver Ridge Elementary School
Silver Shores Elementary School
Stirling Elementary School
Sunland Park Elementary School
Sunset Lakes Elementary School
Sunshine Elementary School
Tamarac Elementary School
Tedder Elementary School
Thurgood Marshall Elementary School
Tradewinds Elementary School
Tropical Elementary School
Village Elementary School
Walker Elementary School
Watkins Elementary School
Welleby Elementary School
West Hollywood Elementary School
Westchester Elementary School
Westwood Heights Elementary School
Wilton Manors Elementary School
Winston Park Elementary School
Virginia Shuman Young Elementary School

Former segregated (negro) schools
At first all the colored schools were, as elsewhere, elementary schools. In part through the efforts of principals Blanche General Ely and Joseph A. Ely, by the end of the segregation era there were three colored high schools in Broward County: Crispus Attucks in Hollywood, Dillard in Ft. Lauderdale, and Blanche Ely in Pompano Beach.

 Bethune Elementary, 2400 Meade St., Hollywood
 Blanche Ely High School, Pompano, opened 1952, still in use
 Braithwaite School, a Rosenwald school, opened 1929, demolished
 Carver Ranches Elementary School, 2201 S. 44th Ave., West Hollywood, now West Park
 Charles Drew Elementary School
 Chester A. Moore Elementary School, 912 Pembroke Rd., Hallandale, demolished
 Collins Elementary School, 1050 NW 2nd St., Dania
 Colored School No. 11, NW 3rd Ave. and 2nd St., Deerfield Beach, later known as Dillard School, then Walker Elementary School, 1925. Building houses the Old Deerfield School Museum.
 Crispus Attucks High School, Hollywood
 Dania Colored School, 1905, in the St. Ruth Missionary Baptist Church. Another school built 1917.
 Davie Negro School
 Deerfield Colored School, opened 1903, first school for African Americans in Broward County
 Dillard Elementary School, 1959. At one time was Dillard High School, Ft. Lauderdale.
 Fort Lauderdale Colored
 Hallandale Rosenwald School, 1929
 Lanier Elementary, 1st Ave. and 9th St., Hallandale
 Hammondsville Colored School
 Liberia Rosenwald School, also known as Attucks School, 3600 NW 22 Ave., Hollywood, 1929
 Lincoln Park Elementary, 600 NW 19th Ave.
 Markham Park Elementary School
 Oakland Park Negro School, later Carter G. Woodson Elementary School, 3721 NE 5th Ave.
 One-room school at Pompano Migratory Labor Camp
 Pompano Colored School, 718 NW 6th St., 1928, renamed Coleman Elementary School in 1954, demolished
 Pompano Project Elementary School
 Sanders Park Elementary School
 Sunland Park Elementary, 919 NW 13th Ave.

See also

WBEC-TV (Broward Schools' educational channel)
WKPX (Broward Schools' radio station)
List of school districts in Florida

References

External links

 Broward County Public Schools

 
School districts in Florida
Education in Fort Lauderdale, Florida
Miramar, Florida
Hollywood, Florida
Pembroke Pines, Florida
1915 establishments in Florida
School districts established in 1915